The 2018–19 Cymru Alliance, known as the Huws Gray Cymru Alliance for sponsorship reasons, was the 29th and final season of the Cymru Alliance, which is in the second level of the Welsh football pyramid.

The league consisted of sixteen teams with the champions promoted to the Welsh Premier League and the bottom team relegated to either the Mid Wales Football League, the Welsh Alliance League or the Welsh National League (Wrexham Area), dependent on the location of that team.

The season began on 10 August 2018 and concluded on 27 April 2019.

Teams 
Caernarfon Town were champions in the previous season and were promoted to the Welsh Premier League. They were replaced by Prestatyn Town who were relegated from the Welsh Premier League and Bangor City who were demoted from the Welsh Premier League.

The bottom three teams from the previous season, Caersws, Llandudno Junction and Queens Park were relegated to the Mid Wales Football League, the Welsh Alliance League and the Welsh National League (Wrexham Area), respectively.

Welsh National League (Wrexham Area) champions, Buckley Town, Welsh Alliance League champions, Conwy Borough and Mid Wales Football League champions, Llanrhaeadr were promoted to the Cymru Alliance.

Grounds and locations

League table 

Notes

Results

References

Cymru Alliance seasons
2018–19 in Welsh football